Valun  is a village on the Croatian island of Cres. 

Populated places in Primorje-Gorski Kotar County
Cres

Valun is a fishermans village located to the southwest of the town of Cres.

The village of Valun was founded as a port of the now abandoned village of Bućov. 

The village is famous as the location where one of the oldest Croatian Glagolitic inscriptions, called the Valun tablet, was found.